The Center for Labor and Community Research (CLCR) is a 501c3 not-for-profit organization based in Chicago, Illinois.

History 
Originally named the Midwest Center for Labor Research, CLCR was founded in 1982 in order to examine the causes and effects of the sharp decline in manufacturing in the 1970s. The goal of CLCR's early research was to determine whether this rapid deindustrialization in the United States was an inevitable consequence of globalization and technological development or whether it was a trend that could be slowed or reversed by effective policy changes.

After almost two decades of in-depth research, CLCR concluded that 80% of losses in manufacturing could have been averted, avoiding much of the subsequent rise in poverty across manufacturing-dependent communities.

References 
 Swinney, D (1998). Building the Bridge to the High Road. 
 Chicago Federation of Labor and Center for Labor and Community Research (2001). Creating a Manufacturing Career Path System in Cook County. 
 Center for Labor & Community Research (2003). The State of Illinois Manufacturing.

External links
 Center for Labor & Community Research (CLCR)
 Chicago Manufacturing Renaissance Council (CMRC)
 Austin Polytechnical Academy (APA)

Business organizations based in the United States